Tattini is an Italian surname. Notable people with the surname include:

Eugene L. Tattini (born 1943), United States Air Force general
Marco Tattini (born 1990), Italian footballer
Paola Tattini (born 1958), Italian sports shooter

See also
Cattini

Italian-language surnames